Ana Camila Donatella Pirelli Cubas (born 30 January 1989) is a Paraguayan track and field athlete who competes in the heptathlon. She is the Paraguayan record holder in the event with her personal best score of 5733 points. Pirelli holds more than a dozen national records in events as varied as the 100 metres hurdles, shot put and the indoor women's pentathlon. Pirelli was the heptathlon silver medallist at the 2013 South American Championships in Athletics. She won the gold medal at the 2013 Bolivarian Games and the 2014 South American Games, breaking games records at both competitions. Pirelli is tied to Paraguay Marathon Club and competes in Paraguay's national competitions under the Federación Paraguaya de Atletismo.

Career

Early life and career
She was born to Juan Carlos Pirelli and Magdalena Cubas in Asunción and raised in Ayolas. Pirelli had an upbringing full of sports – her father was a basketball player while her mother was a former national universities champion in the pentathlon. She frequented the local sports club, Club Social y Deportivo Yacyretá, with her brother in her youth. She took part in basketball, handball and tennis. At age ten she became the national champion in figure skating in her age category. She then turned her attention to swimming and represented her country at an international event in Chile in 2005, setting a national junior record in the 50 metres freestyle swimming event. An interest in athletics followed: she took part in the 2005 South American Junior Championships in Athletics, although the she was last in both the throwing events (shot put and javelin throw) in which she competed. In 2006, she ran a Paraguayan national record of 25.51 seconds for the 200 metres and won the gold medal in the heptathlon at the 2006 South American Youth Championships in Athletics.

Pirelli performed in the 100 metres hurdles and the 4×400 metres relay at the 2007 South American Junior Championships in Athletics, but finished last in both races. The heptathlon continued to bring her greater success, as she managed fourth place at the 2007 Pan American Junior Athletics Championships – an event won by future world championships medalist Brianne Theisen.

First senior competitions
Pirelli entered her first senior international event the year after, recording a personal best score of 4940 points to take 12th place at the 2008 Pan American Combined Events Championships. She began to study sports science at university in Asunción and gained a scholarship to continue her studies at Oral Roberts University in Oklahoma, United States. Her most prominent outing in 2009 was at the South American Championships, where she ranked fifth in the heptathlon.

A national record in the heptathlon came at the 2010 South American Games/South American U23 Championships, where she was the bronze medallist with a score of 5118 points. She performed at two major events in 2011: a score of 5115 points brought her fourth at the 2011 South American Championships in Athletics and a new national record of 5157 points placed her ninth at the 2011 Pan American Games. She set school records when competing for the Oral Roberts Golden Eagles in collegiate competition in 2012: a score of 3765 for the indoor pentathlon preceded a win at The Summit League championship outdoors in a record score of 5254 points in the heptathlon.

Pirelli graduated from Oral Roberts University with a degree in biology in 2012 and was the highest academic performer among the school's student athletes that year.

Multiple record holder
The 2013 season saw Pirelli establish herself among the best ever female athletes from Paraguay. Over the course of the year, she broke the national records in the 200 m (24.64 seconds), 400 metres (56.94 seconds), indoor 800 metres (2:20.44 minutes), 60 metres hurdles (8.79 seconds), 100 metres hurdles (13.70 seconds), indoor long jump (5.67 m), the indoor pentathlon (4032 points) and the heptathlon (5733 points). At the start of the year her pentathlon performance topped the rankings at the Austrian indoor championships and her score ranked ahead of the former South American record held by Themys Zambrzycki, which had been broken by Vanessa Spinola earlier that month. She gave four heptathlon performances outdoors that year. She set a new best of 5617 points at the Brazilian combined events cup in April, then improved to 5683 points to take second place at the 2013 Pan American Combined Events Cup behind Cuba's Yorgelis Rodríguez. She was runner-up to Brazil's Tamara de Souza at the 2013 South American Championships in Athletics – being one of two medallists for Paraguay alongside Víctor Fatecha. Her best performance of the year came at the 2013 Bolivarian Games, where she set a Games record and national record of 5733 points to secure the gold medal.

In her first heptathlon of 2014 she again won a regional gold medal, this time at the 2014 South American Games. Her result of 5669 points was a Games record and she became the first ever Paraguayan woman to win an athletics title at the competition. This included a national record of 13.66 seconds for the 100 m hurdles.

Personal bests
Outdoor
200 metres – 24.39 sec  (wind: -0.1 m/s) –  Medellín, 23 April 2016 
800 metres – 2:13.65 min –  Rio de Janeiro, 16 May 2016
100 metres hurdles – 13.40 sec  (wind: +1.7 m/s) –  Medellín, 23 April 2016 
High jump – 1.68 m –  Ottawa, 1 June 2013 
Long jump – 5.69 m  (wind: -0.8 m/s) –  Cartagena, 6 July 2013
Shot put – 14.36 m –  Santiago, 3 April 2013 
Javelin throw – 48.75 m –  Austin, Texas, 24 May 2012
Heptathlon – 5879 pts –  Medellín, 23–24 April 2016 

Indoor
800 metres – 2:20.44 min –  Linz, 17 February 2013 
60 metres hurdles – 8.79 sec –  Linz, 17 February 2013 
High jump – 1.63 m –  Linz, 17 February 2013 
Long jump – 5.67 m –  Linz, 17 February 2013 
Shot put  – 13.70 m –  Lawrence, Kansas, 27 January 2012 
Pentathlon – 4032 pts –  Linz, 17 February 2013 

Non-combined events
200 metres indoor – 27.09 sec –  Joplin, Missouri, 6 February 2009 
400 metres outdoor – 56.70 sec –  Asunción, 29 April 2017 
All personal best information from Tilastopaja and IAAF

Achievements

References

External links

Living people
1989 births
Paraguayan heptathletes
Paraguayan people of Italian descent
Sportspeople from Asunción
People from Misiones Department
Athletes (track and field) at the 2011 Pan American Games
Athletes (track and field) at the 2015 Pan American Games
Athletes (track and field) at the 2019 Pan American Games
Pan American Games competitors for Paraguay
World Athletics Championships athletes for Paraguay
Paraguayan female athletes
South American Games gold medalists for Paraguay
South American Games bronze medalists for Paraguay
South American Games medalists in athletics
Competitors at the 2014 South American Games
Athletes (track and field) at the 2018 South American Games
Ibero-American Championships in Athletics winners
Athletes (track and field) at the 2020 Summer Olympics
Olympic athletes of Paraguay